Priče matorih pokvarenjaka is the fifth album by the Serbian punk rock band Atheist Rap, released by the band themselves as a free download album, available at the Serbian official site of Converse as well as at the band's official site. During the first twenty four hours, the album was downloaded in 7500 copies. The limited edition of the album was released on CD with four bonus tracks under the SKCNS record label. The bonus tracks featured two cover versions, one The Ruts' "Something That I Said" and Pankrti track "Tko to mora biti zdaj", a rerecorded version of "Waltzer-eliminator" and the instrumental track "Vanredno stanje je redovno stanje".

Track listing 
All tracks written by atheist rap, except track 13, written by Paul Fox, Malcolm Owen, Dave Ruffy, Segs Jennings and Gary Barnacle, and track 15, written by Pankrti.

 Bonus tracks on the limited edition CD release

Personnel 
 Leki (Zoran Lekić; bass, backing vocals)
 Atzke (Aleksandar Milovanov; drums)
 Dulles (Dušan Ječmenica; guitar, backing vocals)
 Radule (Vladimir Radusinović; guitar, vocals)
 Dr. Pop (Aleksandar Popov; vocals)
 Pedericco Rashiid (Vladimir Radusinović; producer)

References

External links 
 Album review at Popboks
 Priče matorih pokvarenjaka at Discogs

Atheist Rap albums
2009 albums